John Workman or Warkman (died 1604) was a decorative painter working in Edinburgh.

A family of painters
He was a son of David Workman, who was himself an Edinburgh painter and burgess of the town, and Margaret Schortess. There were several painters of the Workman family in Edinburgh. John Workman provided decorative painting, gilding, and heraldic work. There is no record of him making portraits.

John and other members of his family probably painted some of the Scottish Renaissance painted ceilings but documentary evidence is sparse. David Workman painted the "roof of the inner tolbuith of the lordis and above the chymnay thairof" in November 1581 for the town coucil for 24 merks.

Royal entry in 1590
Workman's brother James painted a ship, the Angel of Kirkcaldy, which was hired from David Huchesoun to join the convoy bringing Anne of Denmark and James VI back from Denmark in May 1590. He was paid £8 Scots. Painting and decorating the James Royall of Ayr for the king's outward voyage in 1589 had cost more, and an anonymous painter had received £20. Red and yellow, the Stewart colours, seem to have predominated.

Workman and his brother James painted and gilded several items for the Entry and coronation of Anne of Denmark in 1590, including; heraldry for the gates of Edinburgh, imitation stone work in the pends of the gates, decorating the mercat cross, the globe, tabards for actors in the drama, some of them pupils of Edinburgh high school, a bed at the Salt Tron, and a baton and rod for Hercules. The accounts mention "painting the young men". These men escorted the queen on the royal mile in a pageant known as the "convoy of the moors". They wore masks and the skin of their arms and legs was painted to dress them as imagined African people.

James Workman's paintwork within the arches or pends of the city gates was called "drawing of alschellar draughtis", the imitation of ashlar stonework. William Fairlie paid James Workman to paint the six staffs used to carry the canopy above Anne of Denmark used during the Entry and Coronation.

Herald painter
In 1592 John Workman was made a herald painter by privy seal letter.

He painted items for the funeral of the Bonnie Earl of Moray, but not the famous portrait of the dead earl at Darnaway. In March 1595 he painted a new loft for scholars in Trinity College Kirk with sundry colours of oil paints.

He decorated a coach used by Anne of Denmark when she left for England in 1603 at the Union of the Crowns.

John Workman died of plague on 31 October 1604. His will includes a stock of colours for painting, with orpiment and azure.

References

External links
 Edinburgh's welcome to Anna of Denmark: William Fairlie's account

Scottish interior designers
1604 deaths
Artists from Edinburgh
16th-century Scottish painters
Scottish male painters
16th-century Scottish businesspeople